"When Johnny Comes Marching Home" (Roud 6637), sometimes "When Johnny Comes Marching Home Again", is a popular song from the American Civil War that expressed people's longing for the return of their friends and relatives who were fighting in the war.

Origins
Irish-American bandleader Patrick Gilmore wrote the lyrics to "When Johnny Comes Marching Home" during the American Civil War. Its first sheet music publication was deposited in the Library of Congress on September 26, 1863, with words and music credited to "Louis Lambert"; copyright was retained by the publisher, Henry Tolman & Co., of Boston. Why Gilmore published under a pseudonym is unclear, but popular composers of the period often employed pseudonyms to add a touch of romantic mystery to their compositions. Gilmore is said to have written the song for his sister Annie as she prayed for the safe return of her fiancé, Union Light Artillery Captain John O'Rourke, from the Civil War, although it is not clear if they were already engaged in 1863; the two were not married until 1875.

Gilmore later acknowledged that the music was not original but was, as he put it in an 1883 article in the Musical Herald, "a musical waif which I happened to hear somebody humming in the early days of the rebellion, and taking a fancy to it, wrote it down, dressed it up, gave it a name, and rhymed it into usefulness for a special purpose suited to the times."

The melody was previously published around July 1, 1863, as the music to the Civil War drinking song "Johnny Fill Up the Bowl". A color-illustrated, undated slip of Gilmore's lyrics, printed by his own Boston publisher, actually states that "When Johnny Comes Marching Home" should be sung to the tune of "Johnny Fill Up the Bowl". The original sheet music for "Johnny Fill Up the Bowl" states that the music was arranged (not composed) by J. Durnal. There is a melodic resemblance of the tune to that of "John Anderson, My Jo" (to which Robert Burns wrote lyrics to fit a pre-existing tune dating from about 1630 or earlier), and Jonathan Lighter has suggested a connection to the seventeenth-century ballad "The Three Ravens".

"When Johnny Comes Marching Home" is also sung to the same tune as "Johnny I Hardly Knew Ye" and is frequently thought to have been a rewriting of that song. However, "Johnny I Hardly Knew Ye" was not published until 1867, and it originally had a different melody.

"When Johnny Comes Marching Home" was immensely popular and was sung by both sides of the American Civil War. It became a hit in England as well.

Alternative versions
Quite a few variations on the song, as well as songs set to the same tune but with different lyrics, have appeared since "When Johnny Comes Marching Home" was popularized. The alleged larcenous tendencies of some Union soldiers in New Orleans were parodied in the lyrics "For Bales", to the same tune. A British version appeared in 1914 with a similar title, "When Tommy Comes Marching Home". The 1880 U.S. presidential election campaign featured a campaign song called "If the Johnnies Get into Power," which supported the Republicans James A. Garfield and Chester A. Arthur against the "Johnnies" (Democrats Winfield S. Hancock and William H. English).

Lyrics

The original lyrics as written by Gilmore, are:
When Johnny comes marching home again
Hurrah! Hurrah!
We'll give him a hearty welcome then
Hurrah! Hurrah!
The men will cheer and the boys will shout
The ladies they will all turn out
And we'll all feel gay
When Johnny comes marching home.

The old church bell will peal with joy
Hurrah! Hurrah!
To welcome home our darling boy,
Hurrah! Hurrah!
The village lads and lassies say
With roses they will strew the way,
And we'll all feel gay
When Johnny comes marching home.

Get ready for the Jubilee,
Hurrah! Hurrah!
We'll give the hero three times three,
Hurrah! Hurrah!
The laurel wreath is ready now
To place upon his loyal brow
And we'll all feel gay
When Johnny comes marching home.

Let love and friendship on that day,
Hurrah, hurrah!
Their choicest pleasures then display,
Hurrah, hurrah!
And let each one perform some part,
To fill with joy the warrior's heart,
And we'll all feel gay
When Johnny comes marching home.

Some later recordings end each verse with "And we'll all feel glad when Johnny comes marching home." In a John Ford Western, the last line was changed to "And we'll all raise hell when Johnny comes marching home."

"Johnny Fill Up the Bowl"

"Johnny Fill Up the Bowl", which provided the tune for "When Johnny Comes Marching Home", was a topical drinking song that commented on events in the American Civil War. It was frequently refitted with new words by soldiers and other publishers.

A satirical variant of "Johnny Fill Up the Bowl", entitled "For Bales" or, more fully, "For Bales! An O'er True Tale. Dedicated to Those Pure Patriots Who Were Afflicted with 'Cotton on the Brain' and Who Saw The Elephant", was published in New Orleans in 1864, by A. E. Blackmar.

Lyrics
[1]
We all went down to New Orleans,
For Bales, for Bales;
We all went down to New Orleans,
For Bales, says I;
We all went down to New Orleans,
To get a peep behind the scenes,
"And we'll all drink stone blind,
Johnny fill up the bowl".

[2]
We thought when we got in the "Ring",
For Bales, for Bales;
We thought when we got in the "Ring",
For Bales, says I;
We thought when we got in the "Ring",
Greenbacks would be a dead sure thing,
"And we'll all drink stone blind,
Johnny fill up the bowl".

[3]
The "ring" went up, with bagging and rope,
For Bales, for Bales;
Upon the "Black Hawk" with bagging and rope,
For Bales, says I;
Went up "Red River" with bagging and rope,
Expecting to make a pile of "soap",
"And we'll all drink stone blind,
Johnny fill up the bowl".

[4]
But Taylor and Smith, with ragged ranks,
For Bales, for Bales;
But Taylor and Smith, with ragged ranks,
For Bales, says I;
But Taylor and Smith, with ragged ranks,
Burned up the cotton and whipped old Banks,
"And we'll all drink stone blind,
Johnny fill up the bowl".

[5]
Our "ring" came back and cursed and swore,
For Bales, for Bales;
Our "ring" came back and cursed and swore,
For Bales, says I;
Our "ring" came back and cursed and swore,
For we got no cotton at Grand Ecore,
"And we'll all drink stone blind,
Johnny fill up the bowl".

[6]
Now let us all give praise and thanks,
For Bales, for Bales;
Now let us all give praise and thanks,
For Bales, says I;
Now let us all give praise and thanks,
For the victory gained by General Banks,
"And we'll all drink stone blind,
Johnny fill up the bowl".

Notable recordings
The children's songs, "Ants Go Marching", or "Ants Go Marching One By One", and "The Animals Went in Two by Two" ("Into the Ark") re-used the tune and the refrain.

.
Morton Gould's classical arrangement "American Salute" of the song (1943).
The Andrews Sisters, a "Swing Era" sister act, sang an upbeat "swing" version in the 1940s.
English pop singer Adam Faith sang a version titled "Johnny Comes Marching Home", used over the opening and closing title credits for the British crime thriller Never Let Go (1960). This version was arranged and conducted by John Barry. Another version was released as a single, reaching No. 5 in the UK Singles Chart.
Bing Crosby included the song in a medley on his album 101 Gang Songs (1961).
 Patti Labelle and the Bluebells sang a famous rendition live at the Apollo in the 1960s.
 A modification of the tune was used in Stanley Kubrick's 1964 film Dr. Strangelove during the Bomb Run sequence.
 The tune of the song was used for the song "Brave Sir Robin" in the 1975 film Monty Python and the Holy Grail.
Jacob Miller used the melody for his song "Peace Treaty", which was written for the One Love Peace Concert in Kingston, Jamaica, on April 22, 1978, to celebrate a peace treaty between the opposing leading parties.
 The Clash used the melody for English Civil War, released in February 1979.
 A French version (without vocals), "Johnny Revient d'la Guerre", was recorded by Bérurier Noir on the album Macadam Massacre (1983).
 A rendition by Georges Delerue was used alongside Jewish folk song Hava Nagila in the 1990 movie Joe Versus the Volcano played it at 1 hour 20 minute mark. It was a welcome song by the Waponis.
 Guns N' Roses also included the tune in the form of whistling in the intro and outro of 'Civil War' in 1991.
 A rendition performed by the Seattle Symphony Orchestra and Chorale, conducted by Gerard Schwartz, on the album "Portraits of Freedom: Music of Aaron Copland and Roy Harris" (1993).
 A version was made for the 1995 movie Die Hard with a Vengeance by Michael Kamen.
 Galician Celtic folk music ensemble Luar na Lubre used the tune in the song "Os animais" on the 2007 Camiños da fin da terra album.
 W.A.S.P used it as the intro for Heaven's Hung in Black from their 2007 album Dominator. The song centers on a dying civil war soldier who finds the gates of Heaven are sealed.
 The Dropkick Murphys recorded a version of the song on their 2007 album The Meanest of Times, titled "Johnny I Hardly Knew Ya", using old Irish lyrics to the song's beat.
 Folk band Ye Banished Privateers recorded the melody with lyrics about undead sailors as 'When Ye Dead Come Sailing Home' for their 2012 album Songs And Curses.
American singer Angel Snow's rendition of the song appears on the 2013 compilation album Divided & United: Songs of the Civil War.
 The 2015 film Girls und Panzer der Film has an orchestra version play at the appearance of a T28 Super Heavy Tank.
 The Polish band Ludola recorded a Polish version of the song with modified lyrics in their album "Przedwiośnie".

References

Bibliography
Erbsen, Wayne: Rousing Songs and True Tales of the Civil War. Native Ground Books & Music, 2008. 
Lambert, Louis (Patrick Gilmore). "When Johnny Comes Marching Home". Boston: Henry Tolman & Co. (1863)
Lighter, Jonathan. "The Best Antiwar Song Ever Written," Occasional Papers in Folklore No. 1. CAMSCO Music and Loomis House Press, 2012.

External links
"When Johnny Comes Marching Home" , John Terrill (E. Berliner's Gramophone (1893)—Library of Congress Performing Arts Encyclopedia.
"When Johnny Comes Marching Home" (Overview Page—Library of Congress Performing Arts Encyclopedia.
"When Johnny Comes Marching Home" (Sheet Music), Oldroyd, Osbourne H. The Good Old Songs We Used to Sing, '61 to '67, —Project Gutenberg.
 "When Johnny Comes Marching Home" - A Civil War Song Marches On
MIDI and description
Library of Congress copy, For Bales
 

Songs of the American Civil War
Songs about soldiers
Songs about fictional male characters
American patriotic songs
Burl Ives songs
Adam Faith songs
Drinking songs
1863 songs